{{Taxobox
| name = Procotyla
| image = Procotyla typhlops.jpg
| image_width = 240px
| image_caption = Procotyla typhlops
| regnum = Animalia
| phylum = Platyhelminthes
| ordo = Tricladida
| subordo = Continenticola
| familia = Dendrocoelidae
| genus = Procotyla
| genus_authority = Leidy, 1857
| subdivision_ranks = Species
| subdivision = 
See text<ref name="tyler">Tyler S, Schilling S, Hooge M, and Bush LF (comp.) (2006-2012) Turbellarian taxonomic database. Version 1.7  Database </ref>
}}Procotyla is a genus of freshwater triclad. Species of Procotyla are known from North America and Russia.

 Conservation Procotyla typhlops is an endangered species in Maryland.

 Species 

 Procotyla armatus Procotyla baicalensis Procotyla fluviatilis Procotyla leidyi Procotyla typhlops''

References 

Continenticola
Taxa named by Joseph Leidy